Vascoceras is an extinct genus of Cretaceous ammonites included in the family Vascoceratidae. These fast-moving nektonic carnivores lived in the Cretaceous period from the late Cenomanian to the early Turonian. The type species of the genus is Vascoceras gamai from Portugal.

Species 
The following species of Vascoceras have been described:

 V. humboldti
 V. olssoni
 V. angermanni
 V. cauvini
 V. hartti
 V. birchbyi
 V. durandi
 V. gamai
 V. proprium
 V. silvanense
 V. venezolanum

Distribution 
The type species was first described in Portugal. Fossils of species within this genus have been found in the Cretaceous sediments of Angola, Brazil, Colombia (La Frontera Formation), Egypt, France, Mexico, Nigeria, Oman, Peru, Tunisia, United States and Venezuela.

References

Bibliography 
 

Ammonitida genera
Cretaceous ammonites
Ammonites of Africa
Cretaceous Africa
Ammonites of Europe
Cretaceous Europe
Ammonites of North America
Cretaceous Mexico
Cretaceous United States
Ammonites of South America
Cretaceous Brazil
Cretaceous Colombia
Cretaceous Venezuela
Cenomanian life
Turonian life
Cenomanian genus first appearances
Late Cretaceous extinctions
Fossil taxa described in 1898